The 1910 Australian federal election was held in Australia on 13 April 1910. All 75 seats in the House of Representatives, and 18 of the 36 seats in the Senate were up for election. The incumbent Commonwealth Liberal Party (the result of a merger between the Protectionist Party and the Anti-Socialist Party) led by Prime Minister Alfred Deakin was defeated by the opposition Labour Party, led by Andrew Fisher.

The election represented a number of landmarks: it was Australia's first elected federal majority government; Australia's first elected Senate majority; the world's first Labour party majority government at a national level; after the 1904 Chris Watson minority and Fisher's former minority government the world's third  Labour party government  at a national level; the first time it controlled both houses of a bicameral legislature; and the first time that a prime minister, in this case Deakin, was defeated at an election. It also remains the only election in Australia's federal history to have occurred following expiration of a full three-year parliamentary term by the "effluxion of time".

Two referendums to approve proposed amendments to the Constitution were held on the same day. The State Debts referendum was carried, but the Surplus Revenue referendum was not carried.

Future Prime Minister James Scullin and future opposition leader Matthew Charlton both entered parliament at this election. Scullin lost his seat at the subsequent 1913 election and did not re-enter parliament until 1922.

Background
After the 1906 election, the House of Representatives first met on 20 February 1907. Prime Minister Alfred Deakin allowed the parliament to run to its maximum permissible length under section 28 of the constitution (three years). Its final meeting ended on 8 December 1909, and it was then prorogued until 19 February 1910 at which point it expired by "effluxion of time". This remains the only occasion to date where the House has been allowed to expire, rather than being dissolved earlier by the Governor-General. The writs for the election were issued on 28 February, producing the longest gap between federal elections in Australian history.

Results

House of Representatives

Notes
 Independents: William Lyne (Hume, NSW), George Wise (Gippsland, Vic)
 Four members were elected unopposed: two Labour and two Liberal.

Senate

Seats changing hands

 Members listed in italics did not contest their seat at this election.
 Electorates listed as previously won by a margin of 100% were contested in 1906 as Anti-Socialists v Protectionists (Echuca and Hume) or by two Protectionists (Corio and Gippsland): these parties merged to form the Commonwealth Liberal Party on 26 May 1909.

Post-election pendulum

See also
 Candidates of the 1910 Australian federal election
 Members of the Australian House of Representatives, 1910–1913
 Members of the Australian Senate, 1910–1913

Notes
Notes

Citations

References
University of WA election results in Australia since 1890

Federal elections in Australia
1910 elections in Australia
April 1910 events